McKenzie River Reflections is a newspaper serving eastern Lane County in the U.S. state of Oregon since 1978. It is published weekly on Wednesdays, and has a circulation of about 700. It is known for colorful local news, gardening tips and columns like "Ridin' the Rapids." Its founder and editor, Ellen Louise Engelman, died in September 2020. Her husband Ken Engelman, who had previously served as publisher, succeeded her as editor; he is on the board of the McKenzie Discovery Center.

References

External links 
 Official website
 Mentioned in Editor & Publisher (misidentified as Colorado paper): 

Newspapers published in Oregon
Lane County, Oregon